Neyyoor is a town situated  from mondaymarket. It is also a town panchayat of Kanyakumari district, Tamil Nadu. The nearest major town is Nagercoil . The nearest railway station is Eraniel Station.The main attraction of this area is the famous Neyoor CSI Hospital, International cancer centre and CSI Church The airports closer to this town are Thiruvananthapuram airport. People here are friendly towards tourists and the whole town-village has a peaceful environment with rarely seen crimes.  The place is bordered by Eraniel, Thingal Nagar, the postal code is 629802.

Churches
CSI Dartmouth Home Church, Neyyoor.
The Pentecostal Church, Karungal Road, Neyyoor.
Full Gospel Pentecostal Church, Opp. to Bus Depot, Thingal Nagar, Neyyoor.
Apostolic Church of God, Zion Street, Neyyoor
Suvartha House of Worship, West Channel Street, Neyyoor.

Hospitals
CSI Medical Mission Hospital, Neyyoor
International Cancer Centre
Samuel Hospital, Neyyoor

Colleges
CSI Nursing College, Neyyoor
CSI Medical College, Neyyoor

References

Kanyakumari
Villages in Kanyakumari district